Vojtěch Bradáč (6 October 1913 – 30 March 1947) was a Czech football player playing as a forward.

He was a devoted player of SK Slavia Praha.

He played for the Czechoslovakia national team (9 matches/5 goals) and was a participant at the 1938 FIFA World Cup.

References 
  ČMFS entry

1913 births
1947 deaths
Czech footballers
Czechoslovak footballers
Czechoslovakia international footballers
Czechoslovak expatriate footballers
Expatriate footballers in France
1938 FIFA World Cup players
SK Slavia Prague players
FK Viktoria Žižkov players
AC Sparta Prague players
FC Sochaux-Montbéliard players
Ligue 1 players
Czechoslovak expatriate sportspeople in France
Association football forwards
Footballers from Prague
People from the Kingdom of Bohemia